Potamarcha congener is a species of dragonfly in the family Libellulidae. It was first described by Jules Pierre Rambur in 1842, almost fifty years before Friedrich Karsch described its genus. Potamarcha congener is one of two species making up the genus Potamarcha, together with Potamarcha puella.

Distribution
Potamarcha congener is common through much of its range, which stretches through parts of South Asia, South-East Asia, and Oceania, including in countries such as India, Indonesia, China, Australia, and Vietnam. Owing to its wide distribution, the species has been classified as Least Concern by the International Union for Conservation of Nature.

Description and habitat
Potamarcha congener, known as a yellow-tailed ashy skimmer, common chaser, or swampwatcher, 
is a medium-sized dragonfly with a bluish black thorax and yellow tail with black markings. Face is olivaceous yellow to steel black or brown. Eyes are reddish brown above and bluish grey below. In male adults, the thorax and first four segments of the abdomen are covered with bluish pruinescence. In young adults, yellow markings are visible through the pruinescence. The rest of the abdomen is black with orange markings, with the last two segments entirely black. The female thorax has yellow and black stripes on the sides. The abdomen is black with dull orange markings, and has prominent flaps on each side of segment eight. The flaps may serve to hold the eggs in place during oviposition.

This dragonfly is found in terrestrial areas with standing water. This can include near small ponds, rice fields or marshes where it breeds.

Gallery

References

External links

Libellulidae
Odonata of Asia
Odonata of Oceania
Odonata of Australia
Insects of New Guinea
Insects of Indonesia
Insects of Southeast Asia
Taxa named by Jules Pierre Rambur
Insects described in 1842